Neal Morse is the first solo rock album by Neal Morse. It was recorded in March of 1999 at Lawnmower and Garden supply (drums) and Morse's house (everything else) and released on October 5, 1999.

Track listing
All tracks written and produced by Neal Morse.

 "Living Out Loud"  – 4:31
 "Lost Cause"  – 5:02
 "Landslide"  – 5:28
 "That Which Doesn't Kill Me"  – 4:42
 "Everything Is Wrong"  – 5:03
 "Nowhere Fast"  – 3:45
 "Emma"  – 3:16
"A Whole Nother Trip"  – 23:58
a) "Bomb That Can't Explode"  – 9:03
b) "Mr. Upside Down"  – 4:41
c) "The Man Who Would Be King"  – 4:22
d) "It's Alright"  – 5:52

Personnel

Band
 Neal Morse - Lead vocals, synth, piano, acoustic, electric guitars, bass and drums
 Nick D'Virgilio - Drums (all tracks except #1), Backing Vocals
 Glenn Caruba - Percussion (track #8)
 Chris Carmichael - Strings (tracks #7 & #8)
 Dean Resturn - Sampled kicks and snares

Technical personnel
 Rich Mouser — mixing

References

Neal Morse albums
1999 debut albums